Giovanni Rota Rinaldi (3 December 1911 – 10 April 1979), better known as Nino Rota, was an Italian composer, pianist, conductor and academic who is best known for his film scores, notably for the films of Federico Fellini and Luchino Visconti. He also composed the music for two of Franco Zeffirelli's Shakespeare films, and for the first two films of Francis Ford Coppola's Godfather trilogy, earning the Academy Award for Best Original Score for The Godfather Part II (1974).

During his long career, Rota was an extraordinarily prolific composer, especially of music for the cinema. He wrote more than 150 scores for Italian and international productions from the 1930s until his death in 1979 — an average of three scores each year over a 46-year period, and in his most productive period from the late 1940s to the mid-1950s he wrote as many as ten scores every year, and sometimes more, with a remarkable thirteen film scores to his credit in 1954. Alongside this great body of film work, he composed ten operas, five ballets and dozens of other orchestral, choral and chamber works, the best known being his string concerto. He also composed the music for many theatre productions by Visconti, Zeffirelli and Eduardo De Filippo as well as maintaining a long teaching career at the Liceo Musicale in Bari, Italy, where he was the director for almost 30 years.

Early career

Rota was born Giovanni Rota Rinaldi on 3 December 1911, into a musical family in Milan, Italy. Rota was a renowned child prodigy — his first oratorio, L'infanzia di San Giovanni Battista, was written at age 11 and performed in Milan and Paris as early as 1923; his three-act lyrical comedy after Hans Christian Andersen, Il Principe Porcaro, was composed when he was just 13 and published in 1926. He studied at the Milan conservatory there under Giacomo Orefice and then undertook serious study of composition under Ildebrando Pizzetti and Alfredo Casella at the Conservatorio Santa Cecilia in Rome, graduating in 1930.

Encouraged by Arturo Toscanini, Rota moved to the United States, where he lived from 1930 to 1932. He won a scholarship to the Curtis Institute of Philadelphia, where he was taught conducting by Fritz Reiner and had Rosario Scalero as an instructor in composition. Returning to Milan, he wrote a thesis on the Renaissance composer Gioseffo Zarlino. Rota earned a degree in literature from the University of Milan, graduating in 1937, and began a teaching career that led to the directorship of the Liceo Musicale in Bari, a title he held from 1950 until 1978.

Film scores
Nino Rota wrote the score for the film The Glass Mountain in 1949. Notable was the singing of Tito Gobbi. The film won a number of awards.

In his entry on Rota in the 1988 edition of The Concise Baker's Biographical Dictionary of Composers and Musicians, music scholar Nicolas Slonimsky described him as "brilliant" and stated that his musical style:

One of Rota's compositional habits, however, came up for disapproving remarks: his penchant for pastiche of various past styles, which quite often turned into outright quotation of his own earlier music or even others' music. One of the most noticed examples of such incorporation is his use of the Larghetto from Dvorák's Serenade for Strings in E major  as a theme for a character in Fellini's La Strada.

During the 1940s, Rota composed scores for more than 32 films, including Renato Castellani's  (1944). His association with Fellini began with Lo Sceicco Bianco (The White Sheik) (1952), followed by I Vitelloni (1953) and La Strada (The Road) (1954). They continued to work together for decades, and Fellini recalled:

The relationship between Fellini and Rota was so strong that at Fellini's funeral Giulietta Masina, Fellini's wife, asked trumpeter Mauro Maur to play Rota's Improvviso dell'Angelo in the Basilica di Santa Maria degli Angeli e dei Martiri in Rome.

Rota's score for Fellini's 8½ (1963) is often cited as one of the factors which makes the film cohesive. His score for Fellini's Juliet of the Spirits (1965) included a collaboration with Eugene Walter on the song, "Go Milk the Moon" (cut from the final version of the film), and they teamed again for the song "What Is a Youth?", part of Rota's score for Franco Zeffirelli's Romeo and Juliet.

The American Film Institute ranked Rota's score for The Godfather number 5 on their list of the greatest film scores. After being nominated for an Academy Award for this score, the nomination was later revoked when it was discovered that Rota recycled a theme from a previous score, one he wrote two decades prior for the film Fortunella and thus no longer considered original despite being played differently. The nomination was then given to the film Sleuth , while Charlie Chaplin and two co-authors for their score featured in Limelight, a 21-year-old film that had just become eligible because it had not been screened in Los Angeles until 1972, went on to win the award.  He went on to win an Oscar for his score for The Godfather Part II. His score for War and Peace was also nominated for the list. In all, Rota wrote scores to more than 150 films.

Orchestral, chamber and choral music
Rota wrote numerous concerti and other orchestral works as well as piano, chamber and choral music, much of which has been recorded and released on CD. After his death from heart failure in 1979, Rota's music was the subject of Hal Willner's 1981 tribute album Amarcord Nino Rota, which featured several at the time relatively unknown but now famous jazz musicians. Gus Van Sant used some of Rota's music in his 2007 film Paranoid Park and director Michael Winterbottom used several Rota selections in the 2005 film Tristram Shandy: A Cock and Bull Story. Danny Elfman frequently cites Nino Rota as a major influence (particularly on his scores for the Pee-Wee films). Director Mario Monicelli filmed a documentary Un amico magico: il maestro Nino Rota which featured interviews with Franco Zeffirelli and Riccardo Muti (a student under Rota at Bari Conservatory), and was followed by a German documentary Nino Rota - Un maestro della musica. Both explored film and concert sides of the composer.

Operas
His 1955 opera Il cappello di paglia di Firenze (The Florentine Straw Hat) is an adaptation of the play by Eugène Labiche and was presented by the Santa Fe Opera in 1977. In 2005 his opera Aladino e la lampada magica (Aladdin and the Magical Lamp), with Cosmin Ifrim in the title role, was performed in German translation at the Vienna State Opera and released on DVD.  Il cappello di paglia di Firenze and Aladino e la lampada magica are regularly staged in Europe as are many symphonic and chamber titles

Written for a radio production by RAI in 1950, his short opera, I due timidi (The Two Timid Ones), was presented by the Santa Fe Opera as part of their pre-season "One-Hour Opera" program in May/June 2008.

Personal life and death
He had one daughter, Nina Rota, from a relationship with pianist Magda Longari. 

Nino Rota died in Rome on 10 April 1979, aged 67, from a coronary thrombosis.

Quotations

Federico Fellini recalls his first chance meeting with Rota:
"Outside Cinecittà, I noticed a funny little man waiting in the wrong place for the tram. He seemed happily oblivious of everything. I felt compelled... to wait with him... I was certain that the tram would stop in its regular place and we would have to run for it, and he was equally certain it would stop where he was standing... To my surprise, the tram did stop right in front of us."

A critic conversing with Nino Rota at the age of eleven just prior to a performance of his oratorio, The Childhood of St. John the Baptist, in 1923:
Critic: "Do you like playing?"
Rota: "Whenever I can ... Is it hard to write for a newspaper?"
Critic: "It's not easy to do a good article."
Rota: "Have you come from Brussels especially to hear my oratorio?"
Critic: "I certainly have, my little friend."
Rota: "That's really funny. I won't be conducting it tonight. Yesterday the double bass snubbed me."

On his friendship with Igor Stravinsky:
"Stravinsky was fun; his mind struck sparks. Age was no barrier - ours became a true friendship, despite distance and meeting ever more rarely."

Nino Rota reflecting on the unhappiness of others:
"When I'm creating at the piano, I tend to feel happy; but - the eternal dilemma - how can we be happy amid the unhappiness of others? I'd do everything I could to give everyone a moment of happiness. That's what's at the heart of my music."

Federico Fellini on Nino Rota:
"He was someone who had a rare quality belonging to the world of intuition. Just like children, simple men, sensitive people, innocent people, he would suddenly say dazzling things. As soon as he arrived, stress disappeared, everything turned into a festive atmosphere; the movie entered a joyful, serene, fantastic period, a new life."

Works

Discography

References

Further reading
Kennedy, Michael (2006), The Oxford Dictionary of Music, 985 pages, 
Richard Dyer. Nino Rota: Music, Film, and Feeling. New York: Palgrave and Macmillan (on behalf of the British Film Institute), 2010.
Franco Sciannameo. Nino Rota's The Godfather Trilogy: A Film Score Guide. Scarecrow Press, 2010.
John Simon. The Other Rota. The New Criterion, Vol. 34, No. 10 / June 2016

External links
 
 
 
 Schott Music profile

1911 births
1979 deaths
20th-century classical composers
20th-century Italian composers
20th-century Italian male musicians
Conservatorio Santa Cecilia alumni
Best Original Music BAFTA Award winners
Best Original Music Score Academy Award winners
Composers for carillon
Curtis Institute of Music alumni
David di Donatello winners
Deaths from coronary thrombosis
Golden Globe Award-winning musicians
Grammy Award winners
Italian film score composers
Italian male classical composers
Italian male film score composers
Musicians from Milan
Nastro d'Argento winners